Ab Yad may refer to places in Iran:
Ab Yad-e Badri
Ab Yad-e Qahremani

See also
Ab Bad (disambiguation)